ScreenOS is a real-time embedded operating system for the NetScreen range of hardware firewall devices from Juniper Networks.

Features 
Beside transport level security ScreenOS also integrates these flow management applications:

 IP gateway VPN management – ICSA-certified IPSec
 IP packet inspection (low level) for protection against  TCP/IP attacks
 Virtualization for network segmentation

Possible NSA backdoor and 2015 "Unauthorized Code" incident 
In December 2015, Juniper Networks announced that it had found unauthorized code in ScreenOS that had been there since August 2012. The two backdoors it created would allow sophisticated hackers to control the firewall of un-patched Juniper Netscreen products and decrypt network traffic. At least one of the backdoors appeared likely to have been the effort of a governmental interest. There was speculation in the security field about whether it was the NSA. Many in the security industry praised Juniper for being transparent about the breach. WIRED speculated that the lack of details that were disclosed and the intentional use of a random number generator with known security flaws could suggest that it was planted intentionally.

NSA and GCHQ 
A 2011 leaked  NSA document says that GCHQ had current exploit capability against the following ScreenOS devices: NS5gt, N25, NS50, NS500, NS204, NS208, NS5200, NS5000, SSG5, SSG20, SSG140, ISG 1000, ISG 2000. The exploit capabilities seem consistent with the program codenamed FEEDTROUGH.

Versions

References

External links 
 ScreenOS Software Documentation

Embedded operating systems
Real-time operating systems
Network operating systems
Juniper Networks
Computer networking